The International Society for Extracellular Vesicles (ISEV) is an international scientific organization that focuses on the study of extracellular vesicles (EV), including exosomes, microvesicles, oncosomes, and other membrane-bound particles that are released from cells. Established in 2011, the society is a nonprofit organization. It is governed by an executive committee. The current president is Buzás Edit. Previous presidents were Clotilde Théry (2018-2022), Andrew Hill (2016-2018) and founding president Jan Lötvall (2011-2016). The society publishes the Journal of Extracellular Vesicles and the Journal of Extracellular Biology.

Meetings
As part of its mission to promote scientific research and education, the society hosts an annual meeting and educational event as well as numerous workshops on defined EV-related topics. The society also co-sponsors or endorses related events.

Workshops and scientific seminars
ISEV workshops began with a meeting on extracellular RNA (New York City, 2012), and continue to include one to two meetings per year. During widespread restrictions on in-person meetings during the COVID-19 pandemic, ISEV introduced the "Extracellular Vesicle Club," a weekly virtual event featuring presentations and moderated discussion of scientific publications.

Endorsed or co-sponsored events
The society has directly or indirectly supported EV-related events around the world. These include meetings of the UK, French, and Spanish and Portuguese EV Societies (GEIVEX), a course of the European Molecular Biology Laboratory, Keystone Symposia conferences (2016 and 2018), Gordon Research Conferences (2016, 2018, and 2022), a Cold Spring Harbor Asia Meeting (2016), and others.

Journal of Extracellular Vesicles, Journal of Extracellular Biology, and standardization initiatives
To disseminate research in the field, the society established the peer-reviewed open access Journal of Extracellular Vesicles in 2012. The journal was initially published by Co-Action Publishing, by Taylor & Francis from 2016-2020, and by Wiley since 2020. In addition to research and review articles, the journal periodically publishes position papers of the society that are meant to advance standardization efforts.
In 2014, the Executive Board of Directors published a set of minimal information guidelines for publication of EV studies. These requirements, known as "MISEV" or "MISEV2014," mirrored similar initiatives in the fields of microarray (MIAME) and proteomics (MIAPE) analysis, among others. In 2017, the society's board announced its intent to update these requirements with community involvement. The "MISEV2018" requirements were published in 2018 by Clotilde Théry and Kenneth Witwer with input from 380 co-authors.

In 2021, ISEV announced the launch of the Journal of Extracellular Biology, focusing on EVs but also other extracellular particles and phenomena. The editor-in-chief is Andrew Hill.

Education
Among the educational initiatives of the society are massive open online courses (MOOCs), launched in 2016. They are available through Coursera and co-sponsored by the University of Gothenburg, Pohang University of Science and Technology, and the University of California, Irvine.

References

External links

International scientific organizations
Organizations established in 2011
2011 establishments in Sweden